Several ships of the Royal Navy have been named Grinder:

 , was an armed British vessel used as a tender, captured in 1810 by Danish gunboats, recaptured in 1811, and sold in 1832.
 HMS Grinder, was a 14-gun screw sloop ordered in 1847, and renamed  before launch. 

Three dockyard tugs have also been named Grinder:
Grinder, a wooden paddle tug, of 332 tons, was launched in 1868 and sold in 1919.
Grinder was a 300-ton tug ordered in 1941 but captured on the stocks in the Fall of Hong Kong. The Japanese completed her in 1943 as the Nagashima.
Grinder was a 710-ton paddle tug launched in 1958.

References

Royal Navy ship names